Omar Amr (born September 20, 1974) is a former water polo player. He played for the United States national team at the 2004 Summer Olympics.

Amr attended Sunny Hills High School in Fullerton.  He played collegiately at the University of California, Irvine, where he was a twice a second-team All-American selection in 1995 and 1996 and an honorable mention All-American selection in 1994, while receiving his degree in biology.

Amr was one of the final players cut from the USA 2000 Olympic Water Polo Men's Team owing to a late injury but made the 2004 team due in part to improvements in his strength, speed, and defensive play.  While training for the Olympics, Amr attended Harvard Medical School, and would make weekend trips from Boston to Orange County to train with his teammates. The US team finished seventh at the Athens Olympic Games.

After the Olympics, Amr coached the MIT Men's Water Polo team during the 2004 season while finishing up his medical degree at Harvard.

Today Dr. Omar Amr is an emergency room physician who has practiced in Orange County and Stockton.

References

External links
 

1974 births
Living people
American male water polo players
Olympic water polo players of the United States
Water polo players at the 2004 Summer Olympics
Sportspeople from California
People from Bellflower, California
UC Irvine Anteaters men's water polo players
American water polo coaches
Harvard Medical School alumni
21st-century American people